The Amelia Elizabeth Walden Award, presented by The Assembly on Literature for Adolescents of the National Council of Teachers of English (ALAN), is an annual award in the United States for a book that exemplifies literary excellence, widespread appeal, and a positive approach to life in young adult literature. It is named for Amelia Elizabeth Walden who died in Westport, Connecticut in 2002 and was a pioneer in the field of Young Adult Literature.  The national award is presented  annually to the author of a title selected by ALAN's Amelia Elizabeth Walden Award Committee.

History

The Amelia Elizabeth Walden Award was established in 2008 to honor the wishes of Amelia Elizabeth Walden. It allows for the sum of $5,000 to be awarded annually to the winning title, and was first awarded on Monday, November 23, 2009. The award highlights works written for a young adult audience that demonstrate a positive approach to life, widespread teen appeal, and literary merit.

Amelia Elizabeth Walden was born in New York City on January 15, 1909. She graduated from Columbia University in 1934 and attended the American Academy of Dramatic Arts. From 1935 to 1945, she taught English and Dramatics at Norwalk High School (Connecticut). She married John William Harmon in 1946. Her first novel, Gateway, was published in 1946. Walden told her editor that she intended the novel for young people who lived at the gateway, on that middle ground between adolescence and adulthood. Walden claimed, “I respond to young people because I remember my own adolescence so vividly – and fondly. It was a period of total involvement, of enjoying life to the hilt.” Walden wrote over 40 young adult novels. She died in 2002 in Westport, Connecticut. A collection of some of her literary manuscripts and correspondence with McGraw-Hill between 1954 and 1977 relating to book production is available for review in the Special Collections and University Archives of the University of Oregon Libraries.

Criteria

The selection committee composed of ten The Assembly on Literature for Adolescents (ALAN) members (3 teachers, 3 university professors, 3 librarians, and 1 chair) appointed by the previous year's chair and current ALAN President for a one-year term with the possibility of re-election for a second term. They award one winning title and honor up to four additional titles on their shortlist.

Per Walden’s request
The selected title MUST'':
 be a work of fiction, ideally a novel (stand-alone or part of a series);
 be published within one year prior to the call for titles;
 be published in the United States but may have been published elsewhere prior; and
 possess a positive approach to life, widespread teen appeal, and literary merit (please see below for additional guidance).A Positive Approach to Life 
Submitted titles should:
 treat teen readers as capable and thoughtful young people
offer hope and optimism, even when describing difficult circumstances
 have a credible and appropriate resolution
 portray characters involved in shaping their lives in a positive way, even as they struggle with the harsh realities of lifeWidespread Teen Appeal 
Submitted titles should:
 be intended expressly for readers aged 12–18
 have universal themes that transcend time and place
 have themes that resonate with a wide variety of readers, regardless of race, class, gender, and sexual orientation
 provide readers with a window to the world and/or reflect their own experiencesLiterary Merit''' 
Submitted titles should:
 contain well-developed characters
 employ well-constructed forms suitable to function
 include language and literary devices that enhance the narrative
 suggest cogent and richly-realized themes
 present an authentic voice

Recipients

See also

 Printz Award – American Library Association medal recognizing the year's best book for teens
 Newbery Medal – American literature for children (children or young adults prior to 2000)
 Carnegie Medal – British literature for children or young adults
 Guardian Prize – fiction for children or young adults by British and Commonwealth writers

References

External links
 ALAN Online – Assembly on Literature for Adolescents of NCTE
  at ALAN

Awards established in 2008
American children's literary awards